Galesh Mahalleh (also Romanized as Gālesh Maḩalleh) is a village in Pasikhan Rural District, in the Central District of Rasht County, Gilan Province, Iran. At the 2006 census, its population was 299, in 85 families.

References 

Populated places in Rasht County